German Technical University in Brno (German: Deutsche Technische Hochschule Brünn) was a technical university in Brno. It existed from 1849 to 1945 and instruction was in German.

At the time, Brno was a multicultural city with both Czech and German populations. A technical university serving both nationalities was proposed, but fell through, resulting in the establishment of the Czech Technical University in 1899. From 1860, the German Technical University was located on Komenského Square in Brno, and in 1910 a second building was built beside the first one. 

During the Nazi occupation, it was planned for the university to be relocated to Linz, but this did not happen. In 1945, the German Technical University in Brno was closed and its property transferred to the Brno University of Technology.

Literature 
 ŠIŠMA, Pavel. Učitelé na německé technice v Brně 1849-1945. Praha: Společnost pro dějiny věd a techniky, 2004. 205 s. Práce z dějin techniky a přírodních věd; sv. 2. .
 ŠIŠMA, Pavel. Zur Geschichte der Deutschen Technischen Hochschule in Brünn: Professoren, Dozenten und Assistenten 1849 - 1945. Linz: Trauner, 2009. ix, 192 s. Schriftenreihe Geschichte der Naturwissenschaften und der Technik; Bd. 13. .

External links 
 Teachers of physics and chemistry at the German Technical University in Brno
 German Technical University in Brno (1849 - 1945)

German Technical University in Brno
Organizations based in Brno
Buildings and structures in Brno
Defunct universities and colleges
1849 establishments in the Austrian Empire
19th-century establishments in Bohemia
1945 disestablishments in Czechoslovakia